The 2015 Central Arkansas Bears football team represented the University of Central Arkansas in the 2015 NCAA Division I FCS football season. The Bears were led by second-year head coach Steve Campbell and played their home games at Estes Stadium. They were a member of the Southland Conference. They finished the season 7–4, 7–2 in Southland play to finish in a tie for second place. They were not invited to the FCS Playoffs.

Previous season
The Bears finished the 2014 season with an overall record of 6–6 and a Southland Conference record of 5–3 under first-year head coach.    Steve Campbell.  In 2015, the Bears finished the season 7–4 overall and 7–2 in the conference.

Schedule
Source:  

 *-Indicates Game Broadcast via Tape Delay

Game summaries

@ Samford

Sources:

@ Oklahoma State

Sources:

@ Northwestern State

Sources:

Abilene Christian

Sources:

@ Houston Baptist

Sources:

McNeese State

Sources:

@ Lamar

Sources:

Southeastern Louisiana (Homecoming)

Sources:

Stephen F. Austin

Sources:

@ Nicholls

Sources:

Sam Houston State

Sources:

Ranking movements

References

Central Arkansas
Central Arkansas Bears football seasons
Central Arkansas Bears football